, commonly abbreviated AJV, was a cargo airline based in the Shiodome City Center in Minato, Tokyo, Japan. It operated services between Japan and South Korea, using aircraft from the All Nippon Airways fleet. Founded in 2006, the company merged into Air Japan in 2010.

History
The company was founded on 1 February 2006. and started operations on 2 October 2006 with the inaugurational Nagoya (Centrair) - Anchorage - Chicago (O'Hare) service.

By 1 April 2010, when the merger with Air Japan was announced, ANA & JP Express was completely owned by All Nippon Airways.

Route network
As of February 2008, AJV maintained cargo flights from Tokyo (Narita), Osaka (Kansai), and Nagoya (Centrair) to Seoul (Incheon). Earlier, trans-Pacific flights had been operated, but by 2008, ANA's trans-Pacific freight was flown by the mainline and ABX Air wet lease.

References

External links

ANA & JP Express (English Official)
ANA & JP Express (Japanese Official)

Defunct cargo airlines
Defunct airlines of Japan
Airlines established in 2006
Airlines disestablished in 2010
Cargo airlines of Japan
Japanese companies established in 2006
Japanese companies disestablished in 2010